Jackie Geary (born August 22, 1977) is an American actress, writer, and producer known for her recurring roles in NCIS, 13 Reasons Why, and The Goldbergs. Geary was born in Port Jefferson, New York and earned a Bachelor of Arts degree in women's history from Barnard College.

Filmography

Film

Television

References 

1977 births
American actresses
Actresses from New York (state)
People from Port Jefferson, New York
Barnard College alumni
Living people